Attorney General of Lagos state also known as Lagos State Commissioner for Justice is the head of the Lagos State Ministry of Justice.
The officer's duty is to ensure that "the laws of the state are uniformly and adequately enforced". The Attorney General carries out the responsibilities of the office through the Ministry of Justice. The Attorney General is appointed to a four-years term, with a maximum of two terms, by the Governor subject to the approval of the State House of Assembly.
The incumbent Attorney General is Moyosore Onigbanjo, Preceded by Mosediq Adeniji Kazeem.

Statutory duties

By Section 195 of the 1999 Constitution of Nigeria, “There shall be an Attorney-General for each State who shall be the Chief Law Officer of the State and a Commissioner for Justice of the government of that State pursuant to the above provision”. Also the Attorney General shall be the Head the Ministry of Justice, charged with the responsibility to provide a legal services and support for local law enforcement in the state and acts as the chief counsel in state litigation. In addition, the Attorney General Oversees law enforcement agencies.

History
The office was established in 1968, just a year after Lagos State was founded.
Since the establishment of the office, sixteen officials had served in that capacity including Professor Yemi Osinbajo, the current vice president of the Federal Republic of Nigeria.

References

Judiciary of Lagos State
Lagos State